As of 2019, 15 Israeli companies are listed on the Australian Securities Exchange. Nearly all achieved their listings via a so-called "back-door listing" where a currently-listed entity is used as a shell to house the new entity.

The ASX has traditionally hosted a large number of relatively small and early-stage companies due to a long history of mining exploration ventures in Australia. Accordingly, companies with market capitalization of as little as $5–$10m are able to list on the ASX and are not restricted to a secondary market- they list on the main exchange. This enables more liquidity than might be achieved on a US secondary market. Technology firms often seek relatively large amounts of capital to rapidly scale while still at modest market capitalizations. So smaller securities exchanges abroad (Singapore is another purported example) can be a perhaps unlikely but favourable option for listing despite the geographical distance from their original base. Another perceived advantage is the absence of any cap on executive remuneration in Australia whereas such caps exist in Israel.

List of Israeli companies currently quoted on ASX

This is a list of Israeli companies quoted on the Australian Securities Exchange as of 16 February 2019.

{| class="wikitable sortable" border="1"
|- bgcolor="#ececec"
|-
! width="214" height="32" valign="bottom" bgcolor="#ececec" | Name
! width="46"  valign="bottom" bgcolor="#ececec" | Ticker Symbol
! width="43" valign="bottom" bgcolor="#ececec" | Year Listed
! width="149"  valign="bottom" bgcolor="#ececec" | Sector
! width="245"  valign="bottom" bgcolor="#ececec" class="unsortable" | Products / Solutions
! width="138"  valign="bottom" bgcolor="#ececec"  class="unsortable" | Notes
|-
| height="15" valign="bottom" | Mobilicom
|  valign="bottom" | MOB
| valign="bottom" | 2017
|  valign="bottom" | Telecommunications
|  valign="bottom" |  
|  valign="bottom" |  
|-
| height="15" valign="bottom" | G Medical Innovations Holdings
|  valign="bottom" | GMV
| valign="bottom" | 2017
|  valign="bottom" | Digital Healthcare
|  valign="bottom" |  
|  valign="bottom" |  
|-
|Audio Pixels Holdings
|AKP
|2004
|Consumer Durables
|
|
|-
|Fluence Corporation
|FLC
|2007
|Industrial Technology
|
|
|-
|Weebit Nano
|WBT
|2016
|Semiconductor Technology
|
|
|-
|MMJ Phyto Tech
|MMJ
|2015
|Healthcare
|Medical Cannabis
|
|-
|Elsight
|ELS
|2017
|Communications
|
|
|-
|e-Sense Lab
|ESE
|2017
|Healthcare
|Medical Cannabis
|
|-
|Dragontail Systems
|DTS
|2017
|Logistics
|Algo, delivery optimization software
|
|-
|HearMeOut
|HMO
|2016
|Social media
|Audio-based social media
|-
|Ultracharge
|UTR
|2016
|Battery technology
|
|
|-
|MGC Pharmaceuticals
|MXC
|2015
|Medical Cannabis
|
|
|-
|Dotz Nano Ltd
|DTZ
|2016
|Nanotechnology
|Graphene quantum dots
|
|-
|Sky and Space Global
|SAS
|2016
|Space technology
|Nanosatellites
|
|-
|Splitit
|SPT
|2019
|Software and information technology
|merchandise financing

References

ASX